Robert Scott is a New Zealand musician. He is a part of indie rock bands The Clean and The Bats, playing bass for The Clean, and guitar/vocals for The Bats, and writing songs for both. Other bands with which he has been involved include The Magick Heads, Electric Blood, Gina Rocco & the Rockettes, and Greg Franco & The Wandering Bear. Scott has also released several solo albums in several genres, including alternative rock, experimental instrumentals, and traditional folk music.

Scott has also drawn or painted the cover art for many Flying Nun album sleeves. As of 2014, he had a day job as a teacher aide at Port Chalmers School at Port Chalmers.

His first solo album, The Creeping Unknown, was released in 2000 on Flying Nun Records.

Scott is also the father of Superorganism vocalist, B.

Albums

Studio albums

Compilation albums

Awards

Aotearoa Music Awards
The Aotearoa Music Awards (previously known as New Zealand Music Awards (NZMA)) are an annual awards night celebrating excellence in New Zealand music and have been presented annually since 1965.

! 
|-
| 2017 || Robert Scott (as part of The Clean) || New Zealand Music Hall of Fame ||  || 
|-

References

Musicians from Dunedin
People from Port Chalmers
Living people
Dunedin Sound musicians
The Clean members
Year of birth missing (living people)
People from Mosgiel